Jonathan Handel is an American entertainment lawyer, journalist, author and commentator.

He practices entertainment and technology law at TroyGould and currently serves as an executive at WIO. He previously served as outside Special Counsel to SAG-AFTRA. Prior to this, he was a journalist at The Hollywood Reporter, and has also written for the Los Angeles Times and Variety.

Additionally, he has authored five books and is an adjunct professor at Southwestern Law School and lecturer in law at the USC Gould School of Law.

Education and career 
Handel studied Applied Mathematics, graduating from Harvard College in 1982, and Harvard Law School in 1990.

He began his law career clerking for Judge Irving Goldberg on the United States Court of Appeals for the Fifth Circuit in Dallas, TX.

In 1991, he was selected to serve as a federal associate independent counsel to investigate alleged White House political misconduct related to the search of then-Arkansas Gov. Bill Clinton's passport files.

In the months prior to the 2007–2008 Writers Guild of America strike, Handel began publishing a series of blogs on the Huffington Post, leading to him becoming recognized as an expert regarding Hollywood unions.

From 2010 to 2020, Handel was a journalist at The Hollywood Reporter.

In 2020, he was appointed as outside Special Counsel to SAG-AFTRA.

As of 2022, Handel serves as an executive at WIO, an entertainment software company.

Handel regularly provides legal analysis for media outlets such as The New York Times, BBC, Reuters, NBC, CNN, ABC and CBS.

Residuals 
Handel is an expert on entertainment royalties, having authored the only book on residuals.

Personal 
Handel is the son of late sociologist Gerald S. Handel.

Works 
 Entertainment residuals: a full color guide, Hollywood Analytics, 2014
 The New Zealand Hobbit crisis: how Warner Bros. bent a government to its will and crushed an attempt to unionize The hobbit, Hollywood Analytics, 2013
 Entertainment labor: an interdisciplinary bibliography, Hollywood Analytics, 2013
 Hollywood on strike!: an industry at war in the internet age, Hollywood Analytics, 2011
 How to write loi's and term sheets, Jonathan Handel, 2009

References

External links 

 Official webpage
 TroyGould biography
 Media Appearances
 Southwestern Law School
 USC Law School
 Substack
 Journalism Portfolio

Year of birth missing (living people)
Living people
American LGBT businesspeople
American journalists
Harvard Law School alumni
American lawyers
Harvard College alumni